The Santa Clara Hotel, at 111 Railroad Ave. in Wagon Mound, New Mexico, was built around 1900 and 1910.  It was listed on the National Register of Historic Places in 1991.  The listing included two contributing buildings.

It was deemed significant as "one of only a few buildings from the railroad era remaining on Railroad Avenue, the main commercial street of Wagon Mound. Located half a block from the depot, the hotel is historically significant for its associations with the railroad era from which the village of Wagon Mound originated. Architecturally it represents a vernacular expression of the commercial architecture which followed the railroad into New Mexico."

It has also been known as Chamblis Hotel and as City Hotel.

References

Hotels in New Mexico
National Register of Historic Places in Mora County, New Mexico
Victorian architecture in New Mexico
Buildings and structures completed in 1900